The Richmond Paper Company Mill Complex is an historic American paper mill at 310 Bourne Avenue in East Providence, Rhode Island. The first seven of the surviving buildings were built between 1883 and 1887 by the Richmond Paper Company. The property was acquired at auction in 1894 by Eugene Phillips, who operated the American Electrical Works on the premises, adding further buildings between 1900 and 1930 and demolishing several buildings specific to paper processing. The property presently sees a variety of light industrial uses. The Richmond Paper Company is notable as the place where Arthur Dehon Little started his career.

The complex was listed on the National Register of Historic Places in 2006, and is part of the Phillipsdale Historic District.

See also
National Register of Historic Places listings in Providence County, Rhode Island

References

Industrial buildings and structures on the National Register of Historic Places in Rhode Island
Industrial buildings completed in 1883
Buildings and structures in East Providence, Rhode Island
National Register of Historic Places in Providence County, Rhode Island
Historic district contributing properties in Rhode Island
1883 establishments in Rhode Island